Leonel Munder Misiñan (born September 27, 1988 in Havana) is a male beach volleyball player from Cuba, who won the bronze medal in the men's beach team competition at the 2007 Pan American Games in Rio de Janeiro, Brazil, partnering Francisco Álvarez.

References
 
 

1988 births
Living people
Cuban beach volleyball players
Men's beach volleyball players
Beach volleyball players at the 2007 Pan American Games
Sportspeople from Havana
Pan American Games bronze medalists for Cuba
Pan American Games medalists in volleyball
Medalists at the 2007 Pan American Games